Stubby may refer to:
 Stubby (nickname), a list of people with the nickname
 Stubby Kaye, stage name of American comic actor born Bernard Katzin (1918-1997)
 Sergeant Stubby, a decorated war dog from World War I
 WGHR (college radio), an American radio station formerly called WSTB and nicknamed "Stubby"
 Stubby bottle, a short beer bottle
 Fimpen (UK title Stubby), a Swedish 1974 film directed by Bo Widerberg

Stubbies may refer to:
 Stubbies (brand), an Australian clothing brand, best known for their men's shorts 
 Stubbies (surfing), a surf competition at Burleigh Heads, Queensland, from 1977 to 1988